Illya Kalpachuk (born 9 October 1990) is a Belarusian professional football player who plays for Dinamo Brest.

Career
In 2017 he was member of FK Atlantas Klaipėda and in 2018 he played for FK Kauno Žalgiris. After two seasons in Lithuania he returned to Belarus and joined Rukh Brest.

References

External links
 
 

1990 births
Living people
People from Byaroza
Sportspeople from Brest Region
Belarusian footballers
Association football defenders
Belarusian expatriate footballers
Expatriate footballers in Lithuania
Expatriate footballers in Kazakhstan
FC Dynamo Brest players
FC Volna Pinsk players
FC Gomel players
FC Granit Mikashevichi players
FC Gorodeya players
FK Atlantas players
FK Kauno Žalgiris players
FC Rukh Brest players
FC Zhetysu players